A Million Bid is a lost 1914 silent drama film produced by Vitagraph Company of America, directed by Ralph Ince and starred Anita Stewart. It is based on a stage play Agnes by Gladys Rankin (1874–1914). Later filmed by Vitagraph's successor, Warner Brothers, in 1927 starring Dolores Costello.

Cast
 Anita Stewart as Agnes Belgradin
 E.K. Lincoln as Loring Brent
 Julia Swayne Gordon as Mrs. Belgradin
 Charles Kent as Sidney Belgradin
 Gladden James as Harry Furniss

uncredited
 Donald Hall as French Artist
 Harry T. Morey as Geoffrey Marshe
 Kate Price as Squires
 George Stevens as Sharp

References

External links
 
 

1914 films
American silent feature films
Lost American films
Films directed by Ralph Ince
1914 drama films
Silent American drama films
American black-and-white films
American films based on plays
1914 lost films
Lost drama films
1910s American films